The 2020–21 Egyptian Handball League was the 65th edition of the Egyptian Handball League, which Zamalek crowned for the third time in a row.

league System

The 2020–21 Egyptian Handball League system was held in two phases, the first phase divided the 18 teams into two groups, with the first four teams from each group advancing to the next round.
The next round , a stage of one group, wins the most points, and when the points are equal, a play-off is played between them.

The first stage

Group 1

Group 2

The final stage

notes
Zamalek and Al Ahly qualified for a play-off match to determine the League champion, according to the regulations, after equal points.

League Champion Match

Cairo Derby

The first round match of the final stage
Thursday 18 February 2021 

The second round match of the final stage
Friday 16 April 2021 

League Champion Match
Monday 19 April 2021

Resources

Handball in Egypt